Jöri Kindschi (born 8 October 1986) is a Swiss cross-country skier.

Cross-country skiing results
All results are sourced from the International Ski Federation (FIS).

Olympic Games

World Championships

World Cup

Season standings

References

External links
 
 

1986 births
Cross-country skiers at the 2014 Winter Olympics
Living people
Olympic cross-country skiers of Switzerland
Swiss male cross-country skiers
People from Davos
Sportspeople from Graubünden